African International Airways was an all-cargo airline based in Johannesburg, South Africa. The airline operated international chartered cargo flights out of Kent International Airport, United Kingdom, OR Tambo International Airport, Johannesburg and Ostend-Bruges International Airport, Belgium, most of which were on behalf of Intavia Limited.

History 

African International Airways was established and started operations in 1985 in Swaziland. A commercial alliance with South African carrier Executive Aerospace was established in 2002. In late 2008, African International Airways was shut down.

The most notable airlines African International Airlines was operating for were Alitalia (1985–1996), and later South African Airways and British Airways World Cargo.

Fleet 
At March 2007, the African International Airways fleet included the following aircraft:
2 Douglas DC-8-54F
2 Douglas DC-8-62F
1 Douglas DC-8-62F Flown to Kemble and broken down for spares/scrap

References

External links

 Official website

Defunct airlines of South Africa
Defunct airlines of Eswatini
Airlines established in 1985
Airlines disestablished in 2008
Defunct cargo airlines
Cargo airlines of South Africa
Companies based in Johannesburg
2008 disestablishments in South Africa
South African companies established in 1985